Roberto Musacchio (born 3 September 1956 in Miami, United States) is an Italian politician. He was a Member of the European Parliament from 2004 to 2009 for the Communist Refoundation Party (Partito della Rifondazione Comunista; PRC).

During his European Parliament term he sat on the Committee on the Environment, Public Health and Food Safety, was a member of the Delegation for relations with the countries of South-East Europe, and a substitute member of the Committee on Employment and Social Affairs and the Delegation for relations with Australia and New Zealand.

He has Arbëreshë origins.

Career
He obtained a secondary school-leaving certificate in classical subjects (1975).

A former member of the national executives of both the Proletarian Unity Party (Partito di Unità Proletaria; PdUP) and the Italian Communist Party (Partito Comunista Italiano; PCI) – where he was the national official responsible for the environment – he subsequently became a member of the national party executive of the PRC as well (as the national official responsible for the environment).

See also
2004 European Parliament election in Italy

External links

1956 births
Living people
Italian Communist Party politicians
20th-century Italian politicians
Communist Refoundation Party politicians
Politicians from Miami
Communist Refoundation Party MEPs
MEPs for Italy 2004–2009
21st-century Italian politicians